Allen Wilson Jeardeau (April 1, 1866 – April 10, 1900) was an American college football and college baseball coach. He served as the head football coach at the Platteville Normal School—now the University of Wisconsin–Platteville—in 1895 and 1898 and at Louisiana State University (LSU) from 1896 to 1897. In 1896, his first season with the LSU Tigers, Jeardeau led the team to a 6–0 record and a Southern Intercollegiate Athletic Association (SIAA) championship. He was also the head coach of the LSU Tigers baseball team in 1898. Jeardeau was a graduate of the Platteville Normal School and a student at Harvard University. He died of pneumonia on April 10, 1900, at his home near Platteville, Wisconsin.

Head coaching record

Football

Baseball

References

1866 births
1900 deaths
LSU Tigers football coaches
LSU Tigers baseball coaches
Wisconsin–Platteville Pioneers football coaches
Harvard University alumni
University of Wisconsin–Platteville alumni
People from Platteville, Wisconsin
Coaches of American football from Wisconsin
Baseball coaches from Wisconsin
Deaths from pneumonia in Wisconsin